Farina railway station was located on the Central Australia Railway, and later the Marree railway line serving the small South Australian outback town of Farina.

History
In the 1860s, planning begun for a railway 200 miles from Port Augusta heading northwards, partly due to mineral discoveries in the Flinders Ranges and good rainfall in the Far North convincing farmers to settle there. Farina (known as Government Gums at the time) was picked as the terminus for the railway, though it was viewed by a lot of the general public as the first section of a railway to Darwin. The railway reached Quorn in 1879, Hawker in 1880, Beltana in 1881, and finally reached Government Gums in 1882.  SA Governor Sir William Jervois declared the line to Government Gums open on 22 May 1882, and from then on it was known as Farina as the area was expected to be an agricultural area. However, the unusually good rain concluded after a few years of settlement, putting an end to the belief that crops could be sustained in the region. Despite the lack of crops, the railway helped carry other commodities including sheep, wool, and cattle. Farina remained as the railhead for 2 years until the railway was extended to Marree in 1884, helping to transport more livestock and making Farina a through station.
Farina boasted a livestock loading facility that saw thousands of sheep and cattle being loaded onto trains each year. However, the town itself declined after severe droughts and the closure of the nearby mineral mines.
A new standard gauge line to Marree replaced the existing narrow gauge one in 1957, and for a short time, the town was one of the few places that the 2 railways crossed over. Livestock continued to be loaded at Farina, though the town was eventually completely abandoned in 1980.
Goods trains continued passing through the town until 1987 when the railway closed between Marree and Telford Cut. The last passenger train was a special tour by Train Tour Promotions using a set of Bluebird railcars on 9 May 1987. The railway was officially closed on 10 May 1987, and the line through Farina was removed in 1993.

Present Day
Today, the Farina Restoration Group continues to conserve the ruins of the town and the railway. Markers have been placed within the town to show where the track once was, including where the SG and NG line once crossed. A SAR narrow gauge open wagon has been placed on a length of track adjacent to the former narrow gauge goods platform, and the sheep and cattle loading ramps on the standard gauge triangle have been rebuilt with SAR sheep and cattle wagons placed next to them. The water tank and a few railway buildings also remain at the site. The Farina Restoration Group eventually plans to rebuild the narrow gauge station building, which was a standard SAR design made out of wood. Planning is also underway to move locomotive NSU63, currently at the Steamtown Heritage Rail Centre in Peterborough, to Farina in the near future.

References

External links
History and Gallery

Disused railway stations in South Australia
Railway stations in Australia opened in 1882
Railway stations closed in 1987
Far North (South Australia)